[[File:East-Hem 100bc.jpg|thumb|Oḍḍiyāna shown with the name of 'Uddayana in Medieval India, 100 BC]]
Tantric Studies in Memory of Hélène Brunner, Collection Indologie 106, EFEO, Institut français de Pondichéry (IFP), ed. Dominic Goodall and André Padoux, 2007.) An alternate theory places its location in what is now the modern Indian state of Odisha, though this is improbable. 

It is ascribed importance in the development and dissemination of Vajrayāna Buddhism. The region was also an important place for the practice of Śaivite Hinduism. It is seen as the homeland of the Mahārtha (aka Krama Kalikula) lineage of Śaiva Tantra. The first Mahārtha Siddha, Jñānanetra Nātha (ज्ञाननेत्र नाथ), is said to have awakened and taught in this country. It was also called as “the paradise of the Ḍākinīs”. 

Tibetan Buddhist traditions view it as a Beyul (Tibetan: སྦས་ཡུལ, Wylie: sbas-yul), a legendary heavenly place inaccessible to ordinary mortals. Padmasambhava, the eighth-century Buddhist master who was instrumental in the introduction of Buddhism to Tibet, was believed to have been born in Oddiyana. The Dzogchen Siddha Garab Dorje is likewise attributed to this region.

 Location 

Udyāna (Sanskrit "garden, orchard"; is reported as being located north of Peshawar along the Swat River; it was regarded as the furthest part of northern ancient India during the time of Faxian. The 8th century Korean monk Hye Cho wrote in his Memoir of the travel to the five Indian regions that after visiting Gandhara, he went directly north, entered the mountains and after travelling for three days, arrived in Udyana (locally called Oddiyana), a mountainous Buddhist region. From Udyana, he travelled northeast for fifteen days and reached Chitral. Faxian stated that the food and clothing worn by those in Udyana were similar to those residing in the Indo-Gangetic Plain.

The area is said to have supported some 500 viharas of the Sthavira nikāya, at which traveling monks were provided lodgings and food for three days. It was said to contain a Buddha footprint, a rock on which he dried his clothes, and a locale where he converted a nāga. It is said that two schools derived from the Sthavira nikāya, the Dharmaguptaka and Kāśyapīya, were established in this area. Both of these schools had proto-Mahayana doctrines.

While the 6th to 8th century Kabul Ganesh offers a memorial inscription, to Turk Shahis king Khingala of Oddiyana.

The following Hindu Shahis are believed to belong to the Uḍi/Oḍi tribe, namely the people of Oddiyana whose rulers were already known at the time of the Kushan Empire (3rd century CE) and are recorded as early as the 4th century BCE.

Most academic scholars agree that Oddiyana was centred on the modern-day Swat valley of Pakistan. More recently, Alexis Sanderson (2007) carefully revisited the issue of the location, taking note of the various far-flung locations that have been identified with Oddiyana at different times and by different sources. He came to the conclusion, drawn from his careful examination of a variety of old textual citations, that it was located near Kashmir, accepting the modern-day Swat valley of Pakistan as the probable epicentre of a historical Oddiyana.

 Orissa theory 
Another location that has been identified is in the Eastern Indian state of Odisha, through a case founded upon "literary, archeological and iconographic evidence".

Confusion about the identity of Oddiyana is conflated with confusion about the identity of Indrabhuti as Donaldson (2001: p. 11) observes:Laurence Waddell, Sylvain Lévi, Giuseppe Tucci, and Prabodh Chandra Bagchi have convincingly shown that the Tibetan name Urgyan and the Chinese name Wutch'ang correspond to Uddiyana which is identical with modern Swat valley. One writer recently made a renewed attempt to identify Uddiyana with Orissa which he regards as "the cradle of Vajrayana Buddhism". But this is improbable; the Chinese sources refer to Orissa as Wu-T'u or Ota or Wu-cha, while the Tibetans refer to Orissa as Odivisa which must be different from Urgyan or Wu-chang. Moreover, Orissa became a centre of Täntrika Buddhism after the 7th century A.D., while the Swat valley was a centre of Tantric Buddhism long before 700 A.D.

In ancient Indian literature the extreme north-western region of the country, especially Uddiyana, Gandhara, Kapisa and Tukhara, find frequent mention. A Kushan inscription mentions a monk Jivaka Odiyanaka, being the earliest epigraphic reference to Uddiyana. It is certainly not in Orissa or Odivisa. The Vihära of Huviska to which Jivaka Odiyanaka made gift of a pillar was in the north-west. Xuanzang entered India from the north-west route and his biographer clearly locates Udyana's capital in North-West. Faxian, who also came from that pass clearly says that Udyana lay in the north on the Swat river.

In Tibetan Buddhism
Tibetan Buddhist traditions see Oḍḍiyāna as a source of many of their tantric teachings. It is seen as having been a land where Buddhist tantra flourished. Many lineages of Tibetan Buddhism are traced to this region, including Dzogchen (which began with the great siddha Garab Dorje). A number of Vajrayana and tantric practitioners are said to have stayed and practiced there. The first Vajrayana teachings were supposedly given there by Gautama Buddha at the request of the king. According to Dudjom Rinpoche, the Mahayoga and Anuyoga tantras were first revealed in Oḍḍiyāna.

In Tibetan Buddhist literature,  is described as being ruled by several kings each of whom were named Indrabhūti.

Oḍḍiyāna is also often conflated or identified with Shambhala, a magical hidden land (beyul) land inhabited by ḍākinīs and inaccessible to or by ordinary mortals.

In the 'Seven Line Prayer' (of Padmasambhava) revealed in Jigme Lingpa's terma of the Ngöndro of the Longchen Nyingthig and throughout the Longchen Nyingtig Ngondro, Oddiyana is rendered in the form .

Notes

References
 Faxian, A Record of Buddhistic Kingdoms'' (James Legge translation), Chapter 8. (Online at the University of Adelaide Library)

History of Buddhism in India
History of Pakistan
Medieval India
Tibetan Buddhist places
Padmasambhāva